Benjamin Robert Thorpe (November 19, 1926 – October 30, 1996) was an American professional baseball player who appeared in Major League Baseball (MLB), primarily as a right fielder, for the Boston / Milwaukee Braves (–).

Thorpe's 16-year professional career began in 1946. Appearing in 81 games, with 67 starts in right field, Thorpe collected 76 hits, including his only three MLB home runs, with 26 runs batted in, batting .260. Moving with the Braves to Milwaukee for 1953, he got into only 27 games and his average plummeted 98 points to .162. It was his last major-league opportunity. In MLB, he got into 110 total games played; his 83 career hits included nine doubles and three triples, as well as his three homers. He drove in 32 RBI and batted .251.

Thorpe played in the minors from 1954 through 1961. During his minor-league career, he reached double figures in home runs in 11 different seasons.  He died in Waveland, Mississippi, three weeks shy of his 70th birthday.

References

External links

1926 births
1996 deaths
Atlanta Crackers players
Baseball players from Florida
Birmingham Barons players
Boston Braves players
Charleston Senators players
Columbus Jets players
Denver Bears players
Gainesville G-Men players
Houston Buffaloes players
Little Rock Travelers players
Major League Baseball right fielders
Milwaukee Braves players
Milwaukee Brewers (minor league) players
Omaha Cardinals players
Pensacola Fliers players
People from Washington County, Florida
Toledo Sox players
West Palm Beach Indians players
Wichita Braves players